Oppach is a municipality in the district Görlitz, in Saxony, Germany.

Population development

References 

Populated places in Görlitz (district)